Chrysoritis pan, the Pan opal, is a species of butterfly in the family Lycaenidae. It is endemic to South Africa, where it is found in the Western Cape, the Northern Cape and the Eastern Cape.

The wingspan is 20–28 mm for males and 22–32 mm for females. Adults are on wing from August to May, with peaks from October to November and from February to March.

The larvae feed on Osteospermum species, Chrysanthemoides incana and Zygophyllum retrofractum. They are attended to by Crematogaster liengmei ants.

Subspecies
Chrysoritis pan pan (South Africa: Western Cape)
Chrysoritis pan lysander (Pennington, 1962) (South Africa: Eastern Cape, Western Cape, Northern Cape)
Chrysoritis pan henningi (Bampton, 1981) (South Africa: Western Cape)

References

Butterflies described in 1962
Chrysoritis
Endemic butterflies of South Africa
Taxonomy articles created by Polbot
Taxobox binomials not recognized by IUCN